Annett Louisan (born Annett Päge; 2 April 1977 in Havelberg, Saxony-Anhalt, East Germany) is a German singer. She lives in Hamburg, Germany. Louisan is her stage name, derived from the name of her grandmother, Louise. Concerning her birth year, there is conflicting testimony, with the official date being given as 1979. Her first album, Bohème, was listed on German charts for almost a year, with a peak ranking of third place. She appeared on the AVO Session program at Basle on 7 November 2006.

In 2004, Louisan married Gazi Işıkatlı, a Turkish business student, but they divorced in 2008. In June 2014, Louisan married songwriter and Hamburg native Marcus Brosch. Their daughter, Emmylou Rose Brosch, was born on 25 July 2017.

Style
Annett Louisan plays a wide variety of music with blues, soul, jazz and swing. The lyrics of her songs are mostly about love, failure and disappointment. Annett Louisan is one of the few German artists who have obtained a high-profile with chanson-style songs.  Apart from Louisan's own musical interpretation this is due to the lyrics of her producer, Frank Ramond, as well as the compositions of her songwriters, Hardy Kayser and Matthias Hass.  Her lyrics also deal with the politicized issues of female self-conception and societal roles, creating a complex ambivalence.  This became most apparent with her first single Das Spiel. In this song roles with contrary approaches to sexuality and interpersonal relationships (i.e. the child, the woman and the emancipated career) are combined. Musically, her second album moves away from pop and concentrates more on the French-German chanson-tradition.   Bal-musette, Tango and Bossa Nova rhythms give the songs diversity.  Unobtrusive backings allow the often breathy voice of Louisan to remain prominent.

Discography

Studio albums

Compilation albums

Singles

Awards

2005
 ECHO: Female Artist of the Year (National Rock/Pop)
 Goldene Stimmgabel: Best Female Solo Artist (Pop)

References

External links

  Official website

1977 births
Living people
People from Havelberg
Musicians from Berlin
21st-century German women singers